Bart Wilmssen (born 2 November 1971) is a Belgian football defender and later manager.

References

1971 births
Living people
Belgian footballers
Lierse S.K. players
K.V.C. Westerlo players
K.F.C. Dessel Sport players
Belgian Pro League players
Challenger Pro League players
Association football defenders
Belgian football managers
Royal Antwerp F.C. managers